"Alive" is a song by Australian alternative dance group Rüfüs Du Sol, released on 13 July 2021 as the lead single from their fourth studio album, Surrender. The song debuted at number 62 on the ARIA Charts.

In a press statement, frontman Tyrone Lindqvist said "It's a heavier song in some ways, but at its core it's hopeful."

At the 2021 ARIA Music Awards, the song earned the group wins for Best Group and Best Dance Release And at the 2022 Grammy Awards, the song won Best Dance/Electronic Recording

Reception
Emma Mack from Music Feeds said "Their new single 'Alive' is dark and brooding, with broken beat percussion and haunting synths foregrounding intensely personal lyrics inspired by the highs and lows of a year in lockdown. It's underscored, however, by an energy and euphoria that seems destined to uplift dance floors when the trio return to them."

Tyler Jenke from Rolling Stone Australia said "'Alive' is Rüfüs Du Sol at their absolute best, showcasing haunting lyricism, mesmerising broken beat percussion, and ultimately captures the all-too familiar highs and lows of the year that has been."

Track listings

Charts

Weekly charts

Year-end charts

References

2021 songs
2021 singles
ARIA Award-winning songs
Reprise Records singles
Rüfüs Du Sol songs
Songs written by Jason Evigan
Song recordings produced by Jason Evigan